The Inside Man is a British television series that was shown in twelve one-hour episodes in 1969. The mystery drama series, produced by London Weekend Television starred Frederick Jaeger as criminologist Dr. James Austen.

References

External links
Imdb.com: Episode list

English-language television shows